The 2020–21 Navy Midshipmen men's basketball team represented the United States Naval Academy during the 2020–21 NCAA Division I men's basketball season. The team is led by tenth-year head coach Ed DeChellis, and plays their home games at Alumni Hall in Annapolis, Maryland as a member of the Patriot League.

Previous season 
The Midshipmen finished the 2019–20 season 14–16, 8–10 in Patriot League play to finish in a tie for sixth place. They lost in the first round of the Patriot League tournament to Boston University.

Roster

Schedule and results

|-
!colspan=12 style=|Regular season

|-
!colspan=12 style=| Patriot League tournament
|-

References

Navy Midshipmen men's basketball seasons
Navy Midshipmen
Navy Midshipmen men's basketball
Navy Midshipmen men's basketball